Lotus Fivestar Cinemas (M) Sdn Bhd (doing business as Lotus Five Star Cinemas, also known as LFS) is a cinema chain in Malaysia owned by the Lotus Group. Lotus Five Star is also a major Indian movie distributor in Malaysia. LFS Cinemas is the fourth largest cinema chain in Malaysia after Golden Screen Cinemas, TGV Cinemas, and MBO Cinemas.

Overview 
Lotus Five Star is a cinema chain that began in the 1980s and now operates 24 cinemas. LFS screens multilingual movies of different genres to satisfy the interests of its wide range of customers. They also own Coliseum Theatre, the oldest cinema in Malaysia, since 2012 which is more popularly known as the "Indian Cinema" or also  "Tamil Cinema" among the locals due to most of their premieres being Kollywood, Tollywood and Bollywood movies. 13 out of 26 LFS Cinemas are now known as mmCineplexes since 1 October 2017.

List of LFS Cinema Location

Northern Region

Central Region

Southern Region

East Region

Terengganu

East Malaysia

Sabah

Lotus Five Star AV
Lotus Five Star AV is the main distributor of Tamil, Telugu and Hindi films in Malaysia, and also have DVD and VCD distribution rights.

See also 
 Golden Screen Cinemas
 TGV Cinemas
 MBO Cinemas
 List of cinemas in Malaysia

References

Cinema chains in Malaysia
Entertainment companies established in 2004
Privately held companies of Malaysia
2004 establishments in Malaysia